The Keśin were ascetic wanderers with mystical powers described in the Keśin Hymn (RV 10, 136) of the Rigveda (an ancient Indian sacred collection of Vedic Sanskrit hymns). The Keśin are described as homeless, traveling with the wind, clad only in dust or yellow tatters, and being equally at home in the physical and the spiritual worlds. They are on friendly terms with the natural elements, the gods, enlightened beings, wild beasts, and all people. The Keśin Hymn also relates that the Keśin drink from the same magic cup as Rudra, which is poisonous to mortals.

The Kesin hymn of the Rigveda is the earliest evidence of yogis and their spiritual tradition, states Karel Werner. The Hindu scripture Rigveda uses words of admiration for Kesins.

Description
The Keśin were lone ascetics, living a life of renunciation and wandering mendicants.

Yāska (c. 500 BCE) offered several etymological meanings to Keśin, including the sun or the sun God Surya. Sāyana (c. 14th century ACE) supported that view, followed by some early European Sanskrit scholars, including H. H. Wilson and M. Bloomfield. Hermann Oldenberg took the view that the Keśin Hymn described the "orgiastic practices of the old Vedic times" and the "drunken rapture" of the Keśin.

Ralph T. H. Griffith and Heinrich Roth rejected both the Surya and intoxicant-drinking views. Griffith supported Roth's view of the Keśin Hymn:
The hymn shows the conception that by a life of sanctity the Muni can attain to the fellowship of the deities of the air, the Vayu, the Rudras, the Apsarases, and the Gandharvas; and, furnished like them with wonderful powers, can travel along with them on their course.

Werner contrasts Kesin with Rishi, both loners, but the former being the silent wandering types and the latter being the satya (truth-teaching) settled-in-a-hut types.

The Keśin Hymn (RV 10, 136)
The description of Keśin is found in hymn 10.136 of the Rigveda.

Ralph Griffith translation

Karel Werner interpretation

Notes

References
 
 
 
 
 
 
 

Rigveda
Hindu ascetics
Hindu denominations
Hindu mysticism
Shamanism